Azzedine Bouzerar (born 7 July 1953) is an Algerian handball player. He competed in the men's tournament at the 1980 Summer Olympics.

References

External links
 

1953 births
Living people
Algerian male handball players
Olympic handball players of Algeria
Handball players at the 1980 Summer Olympics
Place of birth missing (living people)
21st-century Algerian people